Upton station may refer to:

Upton railway station, in Upton, Merseyside, England
Upton and Blewbury railway station, former railway station in Oxfordshire, England
Upton (PRR station), former rail station near Philadelphia, Pennsylvania, USA
Upton–Avenue Market station, a rail station in Baltimore, Maryland, USA
Upton-by-Chester railway station, a former railway station in Upton-by-Chester, England

See also
Upton (disambiguation)